Novio a la vista, or Boyfriend in Sight, is a 1954 Spanish comedy film directed by Luis García Berlanga. It is based on an idea by Spanish filmmaker Edgar Neville, and produced by Benito Perojo. In 1918 a young Spanish woman is taken to a coastal resort by her parents to find her a suitable husband.

Cast

References

Bibliography 
 Bentley, Bernard. A Companion to Spanish Cinema. Boydell & Brewer 2008.

External links
 

1954 films
1954 comedy films
Spanish comedy films
1950s Spanish-language films
Spanish black-and-white films
Spain in fiction
Films directed by Luis García Berlanga
Films scored by Juan Quintero Muñoz
1950s Spanish films